Jullandar is an alternate spelling of Jalandhar.
 It may also refer to 6 A.M. Jullandar Shere, a single from the album Woman's Gotta Have It by Cornershop.